The 2019 Italian F4 Championship Powered by Abarth was the sixth season of the Italian F4 Championship. Norwegian driver Dennis Hauger dominated the championship, winning twelve out of the 21 races, helping his team Van Amersfoort Racing to become teams' champions. The rookie championship was won by Mercedes junior Paul Aron, who won two races in the overall championship. Hauger's closest challenger Gianluca Petecof won four races, and Roman Staněk, Joshua Dürksen and Giorgio Carrara won one race each.

Teams and Drivers

Race calendar and results
The calendar was revealed on 1 December 2018. Adria International Raceway and Circuit Paul Ricard were replaced in the series schedule by circuits in Hungary and Austria, Hungaroring and Red Bull Ring respectively. The cancelled race from Misano World Circuit was rescheduled to run at Autodromo Enzo e Dino Ferrari in Round 5 as a fourth race.
Hungaroring round supporting Euroformula Open and Red Bull Ring round supporting International GT Open. Misano World Circuit other all rounds supporting Formula Regional European Championship

Championship standings
Points were awarded to the top 10 classified finishers in each race. No points were awarded for pole position or fastest lap. Only the best sixteen results were counted towards the championship.

Drivers' standings

Secondary Classes' standings

Teams' championship

Footnotes

References

External links

Italian F4 Championship seasons
Italian
F4 Championship
Italian F4